Nenad Babović (born 2 January 1976 in Belgrade, SR Serbia, Yugoslavia) is a Serbian rower.

He participated at the 2004 Summer Olympics and finished first in the B final of the Men's Lightweight Fours.

References

External links
 
 
 

1976 births
Living people
Serbian male rowers
Olympic rowers of Serbia and Montenegro
Rowers at the 2004 Summer Olympics
World Rowing Championships medalists for Serbia
European Rowing Championships medalists